Jonathan Joubert (born 12 September 1979) is a professional football player who currently plays for F91 Dudelange. Born in France, he represented the Luxembourg national team.

Club career
The French-born Joubert started his career at the reserves of local side FC Metz before joining CS Grevenmacher for the 1999/2000 season. With them, he won the club's first domestic league and cup title in 2003, subsequently achieving the double.

In 2004, he left Grevenmacher for Dudelange, where he ended up winning eleven league and five cup titles.

International career
Joubert made his debut for Luxembourg in a June 2006 friendly match against Portugal and by October 2017 had earned 90 caps, scoring no goals.

On 3 September 2017, Luxembourg held Joubert's native France to a 0–0 draw, with Joubert himself pulling off a string of saves to keep a clean sheet. Joubert's performance was later praised by French manager Didier Deschamps.

Honours
Luxembourg National Division: 12
 2003, 2005, 2006, 2007, 2008, 2009, 2011, 2012, 2014, 2016, 2017,2018

Luxembourg Cup: 6
 2003, 2006, 2007, 2009, 2012, 2017

External links

References

1979 births
Living people
Luxembourgian footballers
Luxembourg international footballers
French footballers
Naturalised citizens of Luxembourg
CS Grevenmacher players
F91 Dudelange players
Footballers from Metz
Association football goalkeepers
FC Metz players
FC Swift Hesperange players
French emigrants to Luxembourg